Bojana Lečić (Serbian Cyrillic: Бојана Лечић) (born 1991 in Nova Varoš, SFR Yugoslavia) is a Serbian model and beauty pageant titleholder who participated in the 2012 Miss World pageant but Unplaced.

Miss Serbia 2011
Bojana Lečić, 1st runner-up of Miss Serbia 2011, represented her country at the 2012 Miss World Pageant. Bojana was originally supposed to represent Serbia at Miss Universe 2012 but due to the date changes of Miss World and Miss Universe, she competed at Miss World.

References

External links
Serbije Queen website

Living people
1991 births
Serbian beauty pageant winners
Serbian female models
People from Nova Varoš
Miss World 2012 delegates